The Honda Prologue is a battery electric mid-size crossover SUV jointly developed by Honda and General Motors to be marketed in North America. Introduced in October 2022 with sales planned in 2024, it will be the first battery electric vehicle sold by Honda in North America, aside from the experimental Honda EV Plus.

Styled by Honda Design Studio in Los Angeles, it is based on the Ultium architecture and the BEV3 platform developed by General Motors, which it shared with the Chevrolet Blazer EV and Cadillac Lyriq along with its  wheelbase. It is comparable in size with the ICE-powered Passport.

References

External links 

 

Prologue
Cars introduced in 2022
Mid-size sport utility vehicles
Crossover sport utility vehicles
All-wheel-drive vehicles
Production electric cars
Upcoming car models